MacCracken may refer to:

William P. MacCracken Jr. (1888–1969), the first US Assistant Secretary of Commerce for Aeronautics
Calvin D. MacCracken (1919–1999), American inventor in energy storage technology and ice rink construction
Edith Bolte MacCracken (1869–1946), American club woman and civic leader
Frederick MacCracken, KCB, DSO (1859–1949), British Army officer
Henry MacCracken (1840–1918), American educator
Henry Noble MacCracken (1880–1970), American academic administrator, president of Vassar College, Poughkeepsie, New York
John Henry MacCracken (1875–1948), American academic administrator president of Westminster College and Lafayette College
Michael MacCracken (born 1942), chief scientist for climate change programs with the Climate Institute in Washington, D.C.
Trip MacCracken (born 1974), currently the Director of Roster Management for the Jacksonville Jaguars

See also
MacCracken Hall, women’s residence hall on Miami University’s campus in Oxford, Ohio
Jurney v. MacCracken, 294 U.S. 125 (1935), was a case in which the Supreme Court of the United States

McCracken (disambiguation)
McCrackin